538 was a year in the Julian calendar.

538 may also refer to:

 The number of electors in the United States Electoral College
 FiveThirtyEight, American political and statistical analysis blog 
 Radio 538, Dutch radio station aimed at young people
 The number 538, see 500 (number) § 530s